Luz is a commuter rail and intercity rail station in the city of São Paulo, Brazil, serving RFFSA, the intercity rail network of Brazil, CPTM Line 7-Ruby, Line 11-Coral and Line 13–Jade (Airport-Express). It has subway connections to São Paulo Metro Line 1-Blue and ViaQuatro Line 4-Yellow via its underground metro station of the same name.

History
Luz station serves the São Paulo neighborhood of Luz. At the time of the station's construction in the mid-nineteenth century, the neighborhood was characterized by a large embankment that connected the city's downtown area to the Grande Bridge. It also had a botanical garden, which was enlarged by the Governor João Teodoro Xavier de Matos, and would serve as the future home of Luz station.

Land for the station was earmarked from the Botanical Garden Square, though its exact location was not confirmed until 1865. With the support of construction engineer Daniel Fox, superintendent J.J. Aubertin requested to the governor that the station be constructed on the corner of Rua Brigadeiro Tobias, where the current metro station now stands. He also requested that construction follow the previous plans created by the inspector engineer Vasco de Medeiros; otherwise, the station would be displaced to the other side of the Botanical Garden, and two gates would need to be installed to serve Rua Alegre and Rua Constituição. If the station were to be constructed beside the current subway station, however, the installation of one gate would be sufficient to serve both streets.

The initial station building was a small, one-story block. Dispatch facilities, facilities for boarding and arrival, and the residence of the station chief were located inside the station, while buildings for line administration, company engineering, building repairs, and supplies storage were built outside.

On 17 March 1888, station expansion was proposed, leading to the construction of the "second" Luz station. Passenger platforms were expanded and the edifice renovated. After construction, another story was added, bringing the station's height to two stories. The edifice was rebuilt in the neoclassical style and an iron cover was installed over the entrance of the building and the platforms. In 1900, Alfredo Moreira Pinto described the second Luz station as follows:

This building was maintained until the beginning of the twentieth century, when it was demolished for the construction of the third Luz station.

Services

Until 2010, Luz station served as * terminus for CPTM's Line 10-Turquoise. However, after the completion of track improvement works, the line was extended to Brás station. As a result, a platform was left vacant in Luz, allowing Line 7 to now use two platforms - one for boarding and another for disembarking.

Luz station has the second-highest traffic level of all stations on São Paulo's metro-rail network, serving 147,000 passengers per day. Only Brás station, with 150,000 passengers, is more frequented.

Several improvement works were undertaken during the station's recent history, including the construction of an underground transfer gallery below the CPTM tracks. Even so, however, there are concerns that the current Luz station will soon become inadequate as passenger loads grow. This would be exacerbated by planned increases in train frequency at Luz thanks to the future deactivation of Julio Prestes station on Line 8–Diamond and the installation of communications-based train control on Line 11.

The current Luz station is under railway heritage protection, meaning that it cannot be expanded in the future.

Cultural legacy

For many years, the station's clock tower dominated the city landscape, and for a time, served as the basis for clock adjustment in the city. It was destroyed in a fire in 1946 but was replaced five years later.

The station, along with the nearby São Paulo Picture Gallery, marks the boundaries of the Bom Retiro and Campos Elíseos districts. Until the 1970s, a monument to Ramos de Azevedo, the architect responsible for designing many buildings in the area, including the Picture Gallery, stood near the station. The monument was later removed during the construction of the São Paulo Metro.

Tourist Express

Since 2009, Luz has been the terminus of the Tourist Express line, a tourist line that makes trips from Luz to Paranapiacaba and Jundiai.

The Express connects tourists to São Paulo's "Fruit Circuit", which is a region known for its rural tourism and fruit production. Stations are located in the region's largest cities, namely Atibaia, Indaiatuba, Itatiba, Jarinu, Jundiaí, Louveira, Morungaba, Valinhos, Vinhedo, and the district of Paranapiacaba.

References

Companhia Paulista de Trens Metropolitanos stations
Railway stations opened in 1867